Titans of Mavericks was a big wave surfing action sports event that took place south of San Francisco at the surfing site of Mavericks, California.

The contest was initiated in 1999 and last held in 2016. The company then filed for bankruptcy, canceling the 2017 contest and the World Surf League took over the event. In 2019, the World Surf League ended the event indefinitely, citing "various logistical challenges" and "the inability to run the event the last two seasons."

History

The first surfing contest at Mavericks, last known as the Titans of Mavericks, was held in 1999 and was held ten times, with the final contest occurring in 2016. The organizers would invite 24 big wave surfers each year to compete in the one-day event, but it was only held if wave conditions were favorable during the competition season.

Darryl Virostko ("Flea") won the initial contest in 1999, while Richard Schmidt, Ross Clarke-Jones, and Peter Mel took second, third, and fourth places, respectively. The following year put Virostko, Kelly Slater, Tony Ray, Peter Mel, Zach Wormhoudt, and Matt Ambrose in first through sixth places. In 2004, Virostko, Ambrose, Evan Slater, Anthony Tashnick, Mel, and Grant Washburn placed in spots first through sixth.  Tashnick came first in 2005. In 2006, Grant Baker, from South Africa, won first place, with Tyler Smith and Brock Little in second and third. The 2007 contest was called off because unusually mild weather resulted in no days with suitable waves by the end of March, the usual cutoff time for holding the competition. In 2008, Greg Long was crowned Mavericks Champion, Baker won second, and Jamie Sterling won third place, followed by Smith in fourth, Washburn in fifth, and Evan Slater in sixth. The contest was canceled again in 2009.  In 2010 South Africa's Chris Bertish took first place, winning a surfing prize purse of US$150 000, sponsored by Moose Guen, Jane Sunderland, and Barracuda Networks.

In the fall of 2010, a group of surfers, community leaders, and contest organizers formed the Half Moon Bay Surf Group, Inc., intending to control the contest. In October, the San Mateo Harbor Commission granted them the permit, and official planning of the inaugural "The Jay at Maverick's Big Wave Invitational" (as it was then called) began. Invited competitors included 11-time ASP World Champion Kelly Slater and 23 others. However, the contest was not held due to a lack of waves in 2011 and 2012. The 2013 contest was won by Peter Mel, and the 2014 one was won by Grant Baker. The contest was rebranded "Titans of Mavericks", with governance by five Mavericks riders known as the "Committee 5" . The last Mavericks Surf contest was held on February 12, 2016.

AT&T Park in San Francisco hosted live broadcasts of the event on its giant (110 foot wide) video display.

In October 2006, the Monterey Bay National Marine Sanctuary proposed banning personal watercraft from Mavericks, which led to disputes within the sport.

Mavericks contest results
The following is a list of past Mavericks invitational competitions and winners.

Indefinite cancellation of the event 

In 2019, after two years in a row of canceled competitions, the World Surf League announced that the contest had been canceled indefinitely, citing "various logistical challenges" and "the inability to run the event the last two seasons." The competition has not been held since.

References

External links 
titansofmavericks.com

Surfing competitions in California